The 1980 Formula One season was the 34th season of FIA Formula One motor racing. It featured the 1980 World Championship of Drivers and the 1980 International Cup for F1 Constructors, which were contested concurrently from 13 January to 5 October over a fourteen-race series. The season also included one non-championship race, the Spanish Grand Prix.

The season saw a major change of guard in Formula One with the Williams team's first Drivers' and Constructors' titles, the emergence of Nelson Piquet as a championship contender and the debut of future World Champions Alain Prost and Nigel Mansell, while reigning champions Jody Scheckter and Ferrari suffered a terrible season that resulted in Scheckter retiring from the sport at the end of the year. In addition, Frenchman Patrick Depailler lost his life while testing at Hockenheim.

Drivers and constructors
The following drivers and constructors contested the 1980 World Championship of Drivers and the 1980 International Cup for F1 Constructors.

Calendar

Calendar changes 
The Brazilian Grand Prix was originally supposed to be held at Jacarepaguá but parts of that circuit (which was originally built on a swamp) were beginning to sink into the soft ground and the circuit disintegrated badly, so the race relocated to Autodromo de Interlagos.

The Mexican Grand Prix was scheduled to be held on 13 April, but the Autódromo Hermanos Rodríguez circuit was not renovated in time.

The Spanish Grand Prix held on 1 June, was to be a championship race but it had a FISA–FOCA war concerning ground-effect aerodynamics. As a result of the war, Ferrari, Renault and Alfa Romeo boycotted the event. It was announced on Friday's practice that the race to be contested on 1 June was not going to be held under FISA regulations. Therefore, it would not be counted as a Formula One championship race. The race was won by Alan Jones.

The Swedish Grand Prix was originally scheduled to be held on 14 June at Anderstorp Raceway, but was cancelled as enthusiasm for Formula One in Sweden had faded as a result of the deaths of Swedish drivers Ronnie Peterson and Gunnar Nilsson in 1978 and as a result, there was no money for the race to be held, resulting in its cancellation. There was never to be another Swedish Grand Prix.

The French Grand Prix was moved from Dijon-Prenois to Paul Ricard Circuit, in keeping with the event-sharing arrangement between the two circuits.

The British Grand Prix was moved from Silverstone to Brands Hatch, in keeping with the event-sharing arrangement between the two circuits.

The Italian Grand Prix was moved from the Autodromo Nazionale di Monza to the Autodromo Internazionale Enzo e Dino Ferrari because Monza underwent major upgrades, including building a new pit complex which could not be done in time.

The Caesars Palace Grand Prix was originally supposed to be held on 2 November, but the race was cancelled.

Review

Round 1: Argentina
The 1980 Formula One season started in Argentina in January. This event, held at the Buenos Aires Municipal Autodrome located in the sprawling Argentine capital started off badly. After Friday's practice, due to the heat and the suction these ground-effect cars were creating, the track began to break up, and the drivers found conditions difficult and even dangerous. Led by Emerson Fittipaldi, the drivers staged a semi-unsuccessful protest – the organizers did actually fix the track, but not successfully – come race day, the track was still in a dreadful condition. The race went ahead anyway, and the Buenos Aires circuit, being one of the most varied and challenging circuits on the calendar, provided an ultra-exciting race, where many drivers were caught-out by the disintegration of the twisty arena infield section of the No.15 variant of the racing facility. After going off twice and dropping back to 4th after making a pit-stop to clean grass out of his car's radiators, Australian and title favorite Alan Jones took victory in his Williams-Ford/Cosworth. Brazilian Nelson Piquet, who also went off a few times finished 2nd, and Finn Keke Rosberg scored an excellent 3rd in his Fittipaldi. French rookie Alain Prost, in his first ever F1 race, finished 6th and scored his first ever World Championship point. Gilles Villeneuve, competitive throughout in his Ferrari, crashed heavily at the Toboggan left-right sequence of corners after his front suspension failed after possible damage caused to it after a number of off-track excursions the Canadian had during the race.

Round 2: Brazil
The other half of the South American January tour took place in Brazil. This meeting was also met with pre-race difficulties. The safety conditions of the very difficult, demanding and confined 5-mile Interlagos circuit located in the steel-making metropolis of São Paulo had been heavily protested by the drivers for some time, led by South African Ferrari driver Jody Scheckter. The original arrangement was that this Grand Prix was originally supposed to be held at the Jacarepaguá circuit in Rio de Janeiro, and then the drivers would return to Interlagos for 1981 after it would go through a complete resurfacing; but the Jacarepaguá circuit had problems with the tarmac sinking into the ground, so the only option was to return to São Paulo. The drivers protested that the Interlagos track's surface (already notorious for being very rough) was so bad that it was actually dangerous to race on. Also, the barriers and catch-fence arrangements were not adequate enough to protect the cars from the embankments and very rough and uneven-surface of the limited run-off areas there, even though the track was very wide in most places. But the race went ahead anyway, and the Renault of Frenchman Jean-Pierre Jabouille took pole and led for 25 of 40 laps. The Renaults proved to be dominant at Interlagos, which was 2,840 ft (850 m) above sea level, giving the turbocharged Renault engines a considerable horsepower advantage. But he retired with turbo failure and his teammate Rene Arnoux took the lead and won, followed by Italian new-boy Elio de Angelis in a Lotus and Jones in his Williams.

Round 3: South Africa
The F1 teams arrived in South Africa in March, at the fast Kyalami circuit between Johannesburg and Pretoria in the midst of an African summer. Alain Prost crashed his McLaren at the Esses and broke his wrist; he would miss this and the next race in Long Beach; while Marc Surer had it worse – he crashed heavily at Crowthorne and broke his leg; he missed the next 3 races. Like Interlagos before, the even higher altitude of Kyalami helped the Renaults even more so than in Brazil, and this proved to be an invaluable advantage, and the yellow French cars dominated the race. And as in São Paulo, Jabouille led for a while and retired, and Arnoux took the lead from 2nd place and won the race. However, this race effectively brought the FISA–FOCA war into the spotlight. FISA, the governing body of international motorsports (and the organization that the 3 big constructors – Renault, Ferrari and Alfa Romeo – were aligned to) led by Jean-Marie Balestre, argued that the ground effect cars of the time were too fast through corners, and FOCA (Formula One Constructors' Association, representing the mostly British independent constructors) led by Bernie Ecclestone and Max Mosley, argued that the superior road-holding of the independent teams' cars equalized their cars to the power advantages that particularly the Renaults had.

Round 4: United States West
A stop-over in Long Beach, California right next to the Hollywood-dominated landscape of Los Angeles happened 4 weeks after the South African race. The typically pleasant and sunny weather there gave for a relaxed atmosphere at this tight, twisty and rough street circuit (1 of 2 on the calendar – the other being Monaco) which was in contrast to the previous 3 quick Southern Hemisphere circuits used thus far in the season. With its tight, slow layout being lined with unforgiving concrete walls, Long Beach was known then to be the toughest and most punishing race of the season on the car and driver. Nelson Piquet effectively dominated this race in his Brabham-Ford/Cosworth – he took pole, set fastest lap, led from start to finish and took his first of 23 race victories. But the race itself was littered with accidents – there was a pile-up at the Le Gasomet hairpin caused by Alfa Romeo driver Bruno Giacomelli and the 40-year-old Swiss Clay Regazzoni crashed appallingly at the end of the long, flat-out Shoreline Drive when the brakes on his Ensign failed and he crashed head on at 180 mph into Ricardo Zunino's parked Brabham, then through some tires and into a concrete wall. The Swiss was critically injured, but survived; he would be paralyzed from the waist down for the rest of his life.

Round 5: Belgium
The cancellation of the Mexican Grand Prix, supposed to have taken place 2 weeks after Long Beach created a 5-week gap between Long Beach and the Belgian Grand Prix. The F1 circus started its 4-month long European tour at Zolder, where Frenchman Didier Pironi took his first ever victory in his Ligier-Ford/Cosworth ahead of Alan Jones and his Argentine teammate Carlos Reutemann.

Round 6: Monaco
The classic street race in Monaco provided some excitement: there was a big pile-up at the start, where Derek Daly went flying twice over a number of cars at the first corner. He took out Prost in a McLaren, his teammate Jean-Pierre Jarier and Bruno Giacomelli in an Alfa. Didier Pironi led and crashed, and Carlos Reutemann took the lead and won from Frenchman Jacques Laffite in a Ligier-Ford/Cosworth and Piquet in a Brabham.

Non-championship race: Spain
The Spanish Grand Prix at the tight and twisty Jarama circuit near Madrid ended up losing its championship status after Jean-Marie Balestre announced on morning of Friday's practice (in an attempt to put FOCA in their place after drivers driving for FOCA-aligned teams did not show up to drivers' meetings at the previous 2 Grands Prix) that the 1980 Spanish GP would not count as a championship round. Balestre also stripped the drivers of their racing licenses. The FISA-supported manufacturer teams – Renault, Ferrari, and Alfa – all pulled out, and the FOCA-supported independent constructors stayed to race. The race was won by Alan Jones, who had also taken pole. The race's loss of championship status hurt the event quite badly; as it was only to be hosted once more at Jarama during the following year, which saw reduced crowds and a date even further into the year in one of the hottest parts of Europe.

Round 7: France
The abrupt non-championship status of the Spanish Grand Prix and the cancellation of the Swedish Grand Prix at the Anderstorp circuit meant there was a 6-week gap between the Monaco and French Grands Prix. The French Grand Prix took place while the Spanish Grand Prix debacle was still raging on 4 weeks afterwards. With their racing licenses given back to them, the drivers got on with their jobs, and at the Paul Ricard circuit on the southern French riviera near Marseille, Williams driver Jones beat the Ligiers of Jacques Laffite and Didier Pironi on home soil. Jones won the race by 4.52 seconds from a charging Pironi after he had been held up by teammate Laffite for a number of laps.

Round 8: Great Britain
The British Grand Prix in 1980 was at Brands Hatch, just outside London. This race on the challenging and bumpy southern English circuit saw the Ligiers of Pironi and Laffite lead and fall out; Pironi retired after a puncture and Laffite crashed at Hawthorn's. Alan Jones took advantage of the Ligier's problems and Jones managed to hold off a quick Nelson Piquet to win yet again in a Williams, the English team's second consecutive British GP win.

Round 9: West Germany
The German Grand Prix at the ultra-fast Hockenheimring was marred by the fatal pre-race testing accident of Patrick Depailler at the ultra-high speed, top gear, flat out Ost-Kurve 9 days before the race. Suspension failure on his Alfa caused him to crash massively after his car overturned and vaulted the barriers, causing fatal head injuries. Alan Jones took pole from Renault driver Jabouille by mere hundredths of a second, and he led the race until he had to come in with a puncture on the straight before the stadium. Laffite and Reutemann passed Jones, who finished 3rd. Laffite went on to win for Ligier, followed by the Williams duo of Reutemann and Jones.

Round 10: Austria
The European high-speed circuit tour kept coming, and the fastest circuit of the season – the spectacular Österreichring in the Styrian mountains enabled Jabouille to win by mere seconds from Alan Jones. Renault driver Jabouille, who had retired from every race he had participated in so far in the season, finally finished a race. His development work with Renault over the past 4 seasons gave him his 2nd and last F1 victory of his career.

Round 11: The Netherlands
The beach-side Zandvoort circuit near Amsterdam, modified from the previous year saw Brazilian Nelson Piquet win from Frenchmen Arnoux and Laffite. The Renaults dominated qualifying, although Jabouille retired and Jones went out after accident damage.

Round 12: Italy
The European tour concluded with the Italian Grand Prix being held at the Autodromo Dino Ferrari near the town of Imola, rather than Monza. The Dino Ferrari circuit, located near the Ferrari factory and just outside Bologna had signed a deal to alternate the Italian GP with Monza, on the condition Monza improve its track safety and facilities. Although the Monza track owners had already made safety upgrades a year before, the deal had been signed before Monza made changes; so for the first time since 1948 the Italian GP was not held at Monza. The Renaults dominated qualifying at this fast Italian circuit, although they fell out with mechanical problems; and Piquet won yet again and overtook Jones in the championship, who finished 2nd in front of his teammate Carlos Reutemann.

Round 13: Canada
The final leg of the 1980 Formula One season was a 2-part tour in North America, starting in Canada, at the Ile-Notre Dame circuit in Montreal. This race had to be restarted after a multiple pile-up involving Piquet and Jones at the start, when Jones shut the door at the very first corner after the start. Piquet jumped into the spare car, which had a short-lasting qualifying Ford/Cosworth engine in it – and although Piquet was clearly faster than anyone else, the engine in his Brabham blew up early on, and Jones won the race, which effectively gave the gritty Australian his only ever Formula One Drivers' Championship, and Williams's first ever Constructors' Championship. Unfortunately, Jabouille's weekend was much worse than Piquet's: he crashed head on into a tire-wall and broke both his legs.

Round 14: United States East
The other half of the North American visit and the last round of the 1980 Formula One season was the second round in the United States at the fast, dauntingly challenging Watkins Glen circuit in New York State, four hours from New York City and only 5 hours from Montreal. This race had been in doubt for almost the whole season, but on this quick, bumpy, demanding and elevated circuit located in the rolling vineyard hills above Seneca Lake, it did go ahead after a loan was given by FOCA to the organizers. French rising star Alain Prost crashed heavily on Saturday morning practice due to suspension failure at the very fast left-handed Turn 10, the second-to-last corner on the track. Prost received a concussion after hitting his head on his car's steering wheel; he had to miss the race but was at the circuit on race day; he felt he could not trust the car's mechanical strength after a season's worth of component failures on his car, which often led  to accidents; this happened to Prost a week earlier in Montreal. Bruno Giacomelli took pole in his Alfa, the first time an Alfa Romeo had been on pole since 1951. Giacomelli made a perfect start and led for most of this exciting race up until Lap 32, when the electrics in his Alfa failed in the Boot section of the course. Jones, however, produced a storming drive, when he went off at the first corner at the start and dropped to 16th; he stormed through and took 2nd from his Argentine teammate Carlos Reutemann, and then inherited the lead from Giacomelli after the Italian retired. The Australian Jones won his 5th race of the year (6 if Spain is counted) ahead of Reutemann and Didier Pironi in a Ligier. 1978 champion Mario Andretti scored his only point of the 1980 season at Watkins Glen, close to his hometown in Nazareth, Pennsylvania. Unfortunately, this was to be the last championship Formula One race at the rather isolated Watkins Glen circuit. The corporation running the circuit was heavily in debt and went bankrupt after it could not meet Bernie Ecclestone and FOCA's increased demands, and the circuit was struck from the 1981 season calendar in May of that year and although there were other Grands Prix that would be run in the United States during the 1980s aside from Long Beach, the United States Grand Prix would not be run again until 1989 on a street circuit in Phoenix, Arizona- and not one of those venues saw the success and longevity that this event had at Watkins Glen.

A third American race, the Caesars Palace Grand Prix in Las Vegas was supposed to be the final event of the season 4 weeks after Watkins Glen but this event was cancelled.

Results and standings

Grands Prix

World Drivers' Championship standings

Points towards the 1980 World Championship of Drivers were awarded on a 9–6–4–3–2–1 basis for the first six positions in each race. Only the best five results from the first seven races and the best five results from the remaining seven races could be retained by each driver.

International Cup for F1 Constructors standings
Points for the 1980 International Cup for F1 Constructors were awarded on a 9–6–4–3–2–1 basis for the first six positions in each race. All points received by a constructor were retained towards the final total.

Non-championship race
The 1980 Formula One season also included one non-championship race.

Notes and references

External links
1980 Formula 1 review from www.4mula1.ro
1980 Formula 1 Images and results from www.f1-facts.com

Formula One seasons